Labour Square or 1-5 Square (Vietnamese: Quảng trường Lao động or Quảng trường 1-5) is a town square located in Hoan Kiem district, Hanoi, Vietnam.

The square is formed by the intersection between Quan Su and Tran Hung Dao streets and the front ground of the Ha Noi Friendship Cultural Palace.

See also
 Ba Dinh Square

Squares in Hanoi